Highflyer, highflier or high flyer may refer to:
 Highflyer (horse), a British Thoroughbred racehorse
 High flyer (fishing), a vertical floating pole used to locate fishing lines

 HMS Highflyer, various Royal Navy ships
 Yamhill High Flyers, a first-year International Basketball League team based in McMinnville, Oregon
 the Univox Hi-Flier, a model of electric guitar manufactured from 1968 to 1978
 SS High Flyer, a ship that exploded in the Texas City disaster
 "High Flyer", a song by Status Quo from Whatever You Want
 High-Flyer (company), a China-based quantitative hedge fund and AI company

Insects
 Aphnaeus hutchinsonii, or Hutchinson's high-flier, a butterfly of the family Lycaenidae
 Hydriomena furcata, or July highflyer, a moth of the family Geometridate
 Hydriomena ruberata, or ruddy highflyer, a moth of the family Geometridate
 Indianmeal moth, or North American high-flyer (Plodia interpunctella) a moth of the family Pyralidae
 May highflyer (Hydriomena impluviata) a moth of the family Geometridate

Domestic pigeon breeds
 Budapest Highflier
 Danzig Highflyer
 Nis' White-Tail Highflyer
 Serbian Highflier
 Stralsunder Highflier
 Szegediner Highflier
 Vienna Highflier

See also
 High Flyers (disambiguation)